Eccles Pike Fell Race is a fell race run from Buxworth, Derbyshire to the top of Eccles Pike, then back again. It has been run intermittently since 1910, and perhaps earlier.

History 

Eccles Pike is one of the oldest fell races in the country, and has a history going back over 100 years. Its start date is not known, but from 1910 a small cup was awarded to the winner, and the race venue would alternate between the nearby villages of Chinley and Buxworth each year. In the 1920s, the race became part of the Summer Garden Fete each June, and a larger silver cup was presented to the winner. The cup was first won in 1928 by Pat Campbell, the international steeplechaser from nearby Chapel-en-le-Frith; he went on to win the race three years in succession.

The original race series ended in 1937, but was revived in 1969 by the local church committee, and has been held most years since. The 1980 race saw John Wild set the course record of 18:14. Over the years the race has attracted several great names of fell running, with other winners including Ron Hill and Ricky Wilde.

There used to be separate ladies and junior races held on the same day, but now all athletes run together. The winner of the race is still presented with the 1928 cup, whilst the best junior receives the smaller 1910 cup. Since 1995, the race has been organised by local running club Goyt Valley Striders, and it takes place in Buxworth on the second Wednesday evening in August.

Results 

Since the course was last changed in 2009, the best men's time is 21:58 by Andrew Heyes in 2021. The best women's time is 24:53 by Olivia Bush in 2011. The fastest recorded time on any course is 18:14 by John Wild in 1980.

References

External links 

 

Fell running competitions
Sports competitions in England